Each winner of the 1983 Governor General's Awards for Literary Merit was selected by a panel of judges administered by the Canada Council for the Arts.

English

French

References

Governor General's Awards
Governor Generals Awards, 1983
Governor